The "grasping the large and letting the small go" policy  was part of a wave of industrial reforms implemented by the central government of the People's Republic of China in 1996. These reforms included efforts to corporatize state-owned enterprises (SOEs) and to downsize the state sector.

The "grasping the large and letting the small go" policy was adopted in September 1997 at the 15th Communist Party Congress. The "grasping the large" component indicated that policy-makers should focus on maintaining state control over the largest state-owned enterprises (which tended to be controlled by the central government).

"Letting the small go" meant that the central government should relinquish control over smaller state-owned enterprises. Relinquishing control over these enterprises took a variety of forms: giving local governments authority to restructure the firms, privatizing them, or shutting them down.

See also
Economy of China
SASAC
 Guo jin min tui

Notes

 'Letting Go of the Small': An Analysis of the Privatisation of Rural Enterprises in Jiangsu and Shandong Samuel P.S. Ho; Paul Bowles; Xiaoyuan Dong. Source: Journal of Development Studies, Volume 39, Number 4, April 1, 2003, pp. 1–26(26)
 'Toward State Capitalism? Muluan Wu. Source: Twenty-First Century, Volume 110,2008, pp. 24–35

Economic history of the People's Republic of China
Ideology of the Chinese Communist Party